GABA transporter type 3 (GAT3) uses sodium (Na+) electrochemical gradients to mediate uptake of GABA from the synaptic cleft by surrounding glial cells.

Subtype-selective GAT3 inhibitors are known since 2015.

The transporter and its effect on GABA concentrations in the amygdala has been implicated as a key player in the disease of alcoholism. In studies conducted on rat populations, reduction of GAT3 caused rats who formerly preferred sugar to prefer alcohol. Further, studies of deceased alcoholics show a decreased concentration of GAT3 in their brains.

See also 
 GABA transporter 1
 GABA transporter 2
 Solute carrier family

References

Solute carrier family
Neurotransmitter transporters
GABA